The term psychic apparatus (also psychical apparatus, mental apparatus) denotes a central, theoretic construct of Freudian metapsychology, wherein an implicit intake and processing of information takes place, and thereby acts on said information in pursuit of pleasure by way of resolving tension through the reactional discharge of “instinctual impulses”.

Definitions
The apparatus, as defined by Freud, includes pre-conscious, conscious, and unconscious components. Regarding this, Freud stated:

As a psychologist, Sigmund Freud used the German terms psychischer Apparat and seelischer Apparat, about the functioning of which he elaborates:

Freud proposed the psychic apparatus as solely a theoretic construct explaining the functioning of the mind, and not a neurologic structure of the brain.

Moreover, in emphasizing the immateriality of the psychic apparatus, Freud dismissed the matter of its physical substance:

Freud's psychic apparatus is intended to be a means by which our subconscious interacts with the external world. This central psychic apparatus would control the relationship between other existing apparatuses within the unconscious (neural, language, and memory), the basic drives of the person- functioning in the pursuit of satisfaction-, and the constant stream of stimuli from the reality in which one interacts with on a day-to-day basis. Though seemingly related, it was never specified by Freud whether the introduction of the Id, ego, and superego was intended to replace or expand the psychoanalytic model of the psychic apparatus. It has been theorized that it may have been a temporary placeholder prior to the conception and public introduction of ideas such as the id, ego, and superego, making it a foundation upon which Freud could further his expansion of a physiological and mental correspondence in relation to human functioning. However, the most commonly held belief within the psychoanalytic community is that the model of the psychic apparatus was intended by Freud to be the "whole" in which many parts- such as the id, ego, and superego- function throughout, in search of pleasure and avoidance of pain. This following of the pleasure principal is seen to be a “central element in the organization and structuring of the psychic apparatus.” Psychoanalyst and theorist Hans Loewald argued that the interactions between the external world and our internal systems- such as the psychic apparatus and ego- lead from being fluid systems to highly differentiated systems.

Knowledge of the psychical apparatus was acquired through the study of the development of human beings. Id was the name given to the venerable of these tangible domains. In this domain we find that everything has been inherited, everything that was present at birth. Due to the world we find ourselves in, a segment of the id has developed to provide organs. These organs are able to receive stimuli and function as protection, through some adaptation, to act as a mediator between the id and the world. This segment or mediator, has been known as the ego. The ego is then able to satisfy the needs between the id in relation to reality.

References

Philosophy of mind
Unconscious
Psychoanalytic terminology
Cognitive science
Neuropsychology
Hypnosis
Freudian psychology